Generalized granuloma annulare is a skin condition of unknown cause, tending to affect women in the fifth and sixth decades, presenting as a diffuse but symmetrical, papular or annular eruption of more than ten skin lesions, and often hundreds.

See also 
 Granuloma annulare
 List of cutaneous conditions
 List of human leukocyte antigen alleles associated with cutaneous conditions

References

External links 

Monocyte- and macrophage-related cutaneous conditions